Marilyn Baker is a Christian songwriter and singer.

Albums
Christmas With Marilyn Baker, 2005
All That I Am, 2004
From The Beginning, 2002
Changing Me/Overflow Of Worship, 2002
Overflow Of Worship, 1999
Changing Me, 1996
Live '95, 1995
Authentic Classics: Live In Concert, 1995
By Your Side, 1994
The Best Of Marilyn Baker, 1993
Face To Face, 1992
A New Beginning, 1990
Close To His Heart, 1987
An Evening With Marilyn Baker (Live), 1986
Marilyn Baker, 1985
Refresh Me Lord, 1983
Whispers Of God, 1981
He Gives Joy, 1979

References

Discography references taken on November 4, 2006 

Year of birth missing (living people)
Living people